Phrynetopsis trituberculata is a species of beetle in the family Cerambycidae. It was described by Hermann Julius Kolbe in 1894. It has been found in Senegal, Malawi, Gambia, Tanzania, and South Africa.

References

Phrynetini
Beetles described in 1894
Taxa named by Hermann Julius Kolbe